Alkaline is an adjective referring to alkali, a specific type of chemical base.

Alkaline may also refer to:

 Alkaline battery, a power cell
 Alkaline (musician) (born 1993), Jamaican dancehall musician
 Al Kaline (1934–2020), American baseball player

See also
 Alkaline earth metals
 Alkali (disambiguation)